Monte Colombano (in Piedmontese mont Colombon ) is  a mountain in  the Alpi di Lanzo, a sub-group of the Graian Alps, with an elevation of 1,658 m.

Geography 

The mountain is located between the Val Casternone, the Val di Viù and the Ceronda valley and is the tripoint in which the communes of Viù, Varisella and Val della Torre (all in the Metropolitan City of Turin) meet.

SOIUSA classification 
According to the SOIUSA (International Standardized Mountain Subdivision of the Alps) the mountain can be classified in the following way:
 main part = Western Alps
 major sector = North Western Alps
 section = Graian Alps
 subsection = Southern  Graian Alps
 supergroup = catena Rocciamelone-Charbonel
 group = gruppo del Rocciamelone
 subgroup = cresta Lunella-Arpone
 code = I/B-7.I-A.2.b

Geology 
Like others mountains of its area, the monte Colombano too is mainly made of lherzolitic rocks, partially turned into serpentinite.

Access to the summit

The easiest route for the summit is a footpath starting from colle Lunella (a mountain pass which connects Viù and Val della Torre), and follows the SW face of the mountain. The pass can be easily reached from the Colle del Lis. or from Val della Torre, but from the latter starting point the climb is longer. During very snowy winters, and when the snow cover is stable, the summit can also be accessed with snowshoes.

Maps

 Italian official cartography (Istituto Geografico Militare - IGM); on-line version: www.pcn.minambiente.it
 I.G.C. (Istituto Geografico Centrale): Carta dei sentieri e dei rifugi  1:50.000 scale n.2 Valli di Lanzo e Moncenisio and 1:25.000 scale n.110 Basse valli di Lanzo

Notes

External links 
 
 Monte Colombano: 360° panoramic image from the summit on pano.ica-net.it
 

Mountains of Piedmont
Mountains of the Graian Alps
One-thousanders of Italy